The electoral district of Paddington was a Legislative Assembly electorate in the state of Queensland, Australia.

Paddington was created in the 1911 redistribution, taking effect at the 1912 state election, and existed until the 1932 state election. Most of its area was based on the Brisbane North which was abolished at the 1912 election. When Paddington was abolished in 1932, its area was incorporated into the districts of Brisbane and Baroona.

The following people were elected in the seat of Paddington:

References

Former electoral districts of Queensland
1912 establishments in Australia
1932 disestablishments in Australia
Constituencies established in 1912
Constituencies disestablished in 1932
Paddington, Queensland